her0ism (born January 2, 1982) is a Japanese music producer and songwriter, based in Los Angeles, California. Since debuting in 2007, her0ism has sold over 40 million units and received more than 120 #1 records and more than 130+ Platinum/Gold Awards globally.

Career
her0ism selected his professional name because he "Can't be a hero in the everyday life, but I thought that I should have been able to be a hero for the person who heard my music".In 2012, her0ism established the creator team named "ever.y". 

He co-wrote songs with Alex Geringas, Andreas Carlsson, Andreas Oberg, André "GC" Fennell, Carah Faye, CJ Baran, Damon Sharpe, Erika Nuri, Jared Lee Gosselin, Jimmy Harry, Kurt Schneider, Lindy Robbins, Matthew Gerrard, Marty James, Melanie Fontana, Nash Overstreet, and Stephan Moccio.

He has worked with many top artists in Japan, including NEWS, Misia, Nissy, Juju, Mika Nakashima, Miwa, AKB48, Nogizaka46, Kis-My-Ft2, TVXQ, Koda Kumi, Seiko Matsuda, Chris Hart, Da-iCE, Urashimasakatasen, and Little Glee Monster. In the United States, he has worked with Austin Mahone, Shahadi Wright Joseph, Paulina Goto, Set It Off, and After Romeo. He has also worked with Cho Yong Pil of Korea, Queensberry of Germany), and Helena Paparizou of Greece.

His song "Midnight", recorded by Set It Off, reached #1 on Billboard's Current Alternative Albums Chart.

Awards 

 "Yume ga Samete" by Seiko Matsuda and Chris Hart, composed and arranged by her0ism, won the planning prize for the 55th Japan Record Award.
 "Urahara" by JUJU "I", produced, composed, and arranged by her0ism, won the planning prize for the 60th Japan Record Award.

Selected discography

References

1982 births
Living people
Japanese producers
21st-century Japanese musicians